Jasmin Airways (Arabic : ياسمين للطيران) is a Tunisian charter airline founded in December 2019.

History 
In 2011, Abderrazek Ben Amara decided to create a specialized charter airline. A 2015 planned launch for the airline was aborted.

On December 5, 2019, the company received its air operator's certificate, allowing it to operate as an airline. The first flights began on December 20, 2019.

The company is part of a Tunisian group including Airline Flight Academy, a local flight school and Universite ESAT. The company has also partnered with Hasdrubal Hotel Group and Thalassa Travel Tunisia.

As of December 2019, its director is Ali Ben Amara.

Destinations 
The company plans to provide flights from the Maghreb and Europe to airports like Enfida and Djerba. They also plan to support Tunisair Express' operations in Djerba and Tozeur.

Their first flight was on December 20, 2019 carrying Italian football club Hellas Verona to its game against the Tunisian Club Africain.

 Tunisia
 Enfida-Hammamet International Airport (hub)
 Djerba-Zarziz International Airport
 Tunis-Carthage International Airport
 Tozeur-Nefta International Airport

 Germany
 Cologne

 Italy
 Verona Villafranca Airport
 Bologna Airport

Fleet

References

External links 

 

Airlines established in 2019
Charter airlines
Airlines of Tunisia